Mehndi Rang Lagyo is a 1960 Indian Gujarati-language romantic film directed by Manhar Raskapur starring Rajendra Kumar and Usha Kiran. It is particularly remembered for its soundtrack by Gujarati music composer Avinash Vyas featuring songs sung by Lata Mangeshkar, Manna Dey and Mahendra Kapoor. The film was produced by Bipin Gajjar and written by Chaturbhuj Doshi.

Cast 
 Rajendra Kumar
 Usha Kiran
 Chandravadan Bhatt
 Satish Vyas
 Keshav
 Toral Divetia
 Kiran Lal
 Chandrakant Sangani
 Honey Chhaya
 Jayesh Desai
 B. M. Vyas
 Bhimjibhai
 Narayan Ragjor
 Jaya Bhatt
 Niharika Divetia
 Upendra Trivedi
 Madan Saigal
 Mamta Bhatt
 Nitin Shah

Music

The film's music was composed by Avinash Vyas, and features songs sung by famous Bollywood singers like Lata Mangeshkar, Manna Dey, Mohammed Rafi and Mahendra Kapoor. The Garba song "Mehndi Te Vavi Malve" is still very popular and is played during celebrations especially weddings and Navratri.

References

External links
 

Films scored by Avinash Vyas
1980 Indian film awards
Films shot in Gujarat
1960s Gujarati-language films